Jeremy Barrett (born April 10, 1984) is an American former pair skater. With Caydee Denney, he became the 2010 U.S. national champion and competed at the 2010 Winter Olympics. During the pairs short program at the 2010 Olympics, Denney and Barrett became the first team to land a throw triple Lutz jump at any Winter Olympic competition.

Personal life 
Barrett was born on April 10, 1984, in Sarasota, Florida. He married former pair skater Lucy Galleher on April 30, 2016, in Fort Lauderdale, Florida.

Career 
Barrett began skating at the age of eight. He competed as a single skater on the novice level at the regional level. His first pairs partner was his sister Shawn-Marie and they competed at the U.S. Junior Championships.

Barrett teamed up with Shantel Jordan in 2001. Because of the age difference between them, they were unable to compete internationally on the junior level. They were the 2004 U.S. national junior champions. They competed at the 2005 French Championships as guests and placed first on the senior level. Their partnership ended in 2006.

Barrett began skating with Caydee Denney in 2006 but the partnership did not last. They teamed up again in 2008 and began competing in the 2008-09 season. They placed 4th at the 2008 Nebelhorn Trophy. They won the silver medal at the 2009 U.S. Nationals. They placed sixth at the 2009 Four Continents Championships. The following season they won the U.S. national title and the right to compete at the Olympics where they finished 13th. During the pairs short program at the 2010 Olympics, they became the first team to land a throw triple Lutz jump at any Winter Olympic competition. They placed 7th at the 2010 World Championships.

Denney/Barrett were coached by Jim Peterson in Ellenton, Florida until August 2010, when the pair joined John Zimmerman and Silvia Fontana in Coral Springs, Florida. At the 2011 U.S. Nationals, they won the bronze medal and were assigned to compete at Four Continents, however they were forced to withdraw. Denney accidentally sliced Barrett's calf on his right leg while practicing side-by-side jumps. He explained that "It cut all the way to the muscle, so I had to get 12 stitches on the muscles, 14 to close that up and 16 on the outside."

Denney and Barrett ended their partnership in February 2011. Barrett said he intended to focus on coaching and performing in shows.

Programs
(with Denney)

Competitive highlights

With Denney

With Jordan

References

External links

 
 
 Denney/Barrett at Tracings.net

1984 births
Sportspeople from Sarasota, Florida
American male pair skaters
Figure skaters at the 2010 Winter Olympics
Olympic figure skaters of the United States
Living people
20th-century American people
21st-century American people